A moon bridge (月桥), also known as “sori-bashi" (反り橋) in Japanese, or as a drum bridge (“taiko-bashi” 太鼓橋), is a highly arched pedestrian bridge. The moon bridge originated in China and was later introduced to Japan, where it became synonymous with Japanese landscape architecture. However, the general shape of this bridge can be seen throughout East Asian cultures.

Generally, these bridges are non-functional, serving as ornamentation. However, they were originally designed to allow pedestrians to cross canals while allowing the passage of barges beneath. To achieve this height in normal bridge construction, significant space from the river banks must be used for the approaches of the bridge. The climbing ascent and descent of the moon bridge has the advantage of conserving this space. These approaches can be very steep on moon bridges, sometimes requiring ladder-like rungs to be affixed to the bridge.

Moon bridges can be constructed from a variety of materials and construction techniques. Some wooden moon bridges employ a “woven-arch” style: cross beams are threaded between the longitudinal members, developing inherent stiffness and shape. Though rare, this technique is displayed on the 12th century Chinese “Rainbow Bridge”, the 1913 moon bridge in the Japanese garden of the Huntington Library in California.   

In formal garden design, a moon bridge is placed so that it is reflected in still water. The high arch and its reflection form a circle, symbolizing the moon. By forming a reflected full circle, the bridge also symbolizes purity: the Chinese words for “full” and “circle” together translate to “perfection”.

See also
Moon gate
Chinese garden

References

Footbridges
Bridges by structural type
Deck arch bridges
Garden features
Chinese gardening styles
Japanese style of gardening
Japanese architectural features
Architecture in China